Hiligaynon, also often referred to as Ilonggo or Binisaya/Bisaya nga Hiniligaynon/Inilonggo, is an Austronesian regional language spoken in the Philippines by about 9.1 million people, predominantly in Western Visayas and Soccsksargen, most of whom belong to the Hiligaynon people. It is the second-most widely spoken language in the Visayas and belongs to the Bisayan languages, and it is more distantly related to other Philippine languages.

It also has one of the largest native language-speaking populations of the Philippines, despite it not being taught and studied formally in schools and universities until 2012. Hiligaynon is given the ISO 639-2 three-letter code hil, but has no ISO 639-1 two-letter code.

Hiligaynon is mainly concentrated in the regions of Western Visayas (Iloilo, Capiz, Guimaras, and Negros Occidental), as well as in South Cotabato (including General Santos), Sultan Kudarat, and North Cotabato in Soccsksargen. It is also spoken in other neighboring provinces, such as Antique and Aklan in Western Visayas, Negros Oriental in Central Visayas, Masbate in Bicol Region, and Romblon and Palawan in Mimaropa. It is also spoken as a second language by Kinaray-a speakers in Antique, Aklanon/Malaynon speakers in Aklan, Capiznon speakers in Capiz and Cebuano speakers in Negros Oriental. There are approximately 9,300,000 people in and out of the Philippines who are native speakers of Hiligaynon and an additional 5,000,000 capable of speaking it with a substantial degree of proficiency.

Nomenclature
 

Aside from Hiligaynon, the language is also referred to as Ilonggo (also spelled Ilongo), as it originated in Iloilo. Many speakers outside Iloilo argue, however, that this is an incorrect usage of the word Ilonggo. In precise usage, these people opine that Ilonggo should be used only in relation to the ethnolinguistic group of native inhabitants of Iloilo and the culture associated with native Hiligaynon speakers in that place, including their language. The disagreement over the usage of Ilonggo to refer to the language extends to Philippine language specialists and native laypeople.

Historically, the term Visayan had originally been applied to the people of Panay; however, in terms of language, Visayan is more used today to refer to what is also known as Cebuano. As pointed out by H. Otley Beyer and other anthropologists, the term Visayan was first applied only to the people of Panay and to their settlements eastward in the island of Negros (especially its western portion), and northward in the smaller islands, which now compose the province of Romblon. In fact, at the early part of Spanish Colonization in the Philippines, the Spaniards used the term Visayan only for these areas. While the people of Cebu, Bohol and Leyte were for a long time known only as Pintados. The name Visayan was later extended to these other islands because, as several of the early writers state, their languages are closely allied to the Visayan dialect of Panay.

History

Historical evidence from observations of early Spanish explorers in the Archipelago shows that the nomenclature used to refer to this language had its origin among the people of the coasts or people of the Ilawod ("") in Iloilo, Panay, whom Spanish explorer Miguel de Loarca called Yligueynes (or the more popular term Hiligaynon, also referred to by the Karay-a people as Siná). The term Hiligaynon came from the root word  ('to go downstream'), referring to a flowing river in Iloilo.

Dialects
Similar to many languages in the Philippines, very little research on dialectology has been done on Hiligaynon. Standard Hiligaynon, simply called Ilonggo, is the dialect that is used in the province of Iloilo, primarily in the northern and eastern portions of the province. It has a more traditional and extensive vocabulary, whereas the Urban Hiligaynon dialect spoken in Metro Iloilo has a more simplified or modern vocabulary. Another example, ('this is it') in Standard Hiligaynon can be simplified in Urban Hiligaynon and become .

Some of the other widely recognized dialects of the language, aside from Standard Hiligaynon and Urban Hiligaynon, are Bacolodnon Hiligaynon (Metro Bacolod dialect), Negrense Hiligaynon (provincial Negros Occidental dialect that is composed of three sub-variants: Northern, Central and Southern Negrense Hiligaynon), Guimaras Hiligaynon, and Mindanao Hiligaynon.

Some native speakers also consider Kinaray-a (also known as Hiniraya or Antiqueño) and Capiznon dialects of Hiligaynon; however, linguists have classified Kinaray-a as a Western Bisayan language, while Capiznon is a Central Bisayan language closely related to Hiligaynon.

Phonology

Consonants

Vowels

Writing system
Hiligaynon is written using the Latin script. Until the second half of the 20th century, Hiligaynon was widely written largely following Spanish orthographic conventions. Nowadays there is no officially recognized standard orthography for the language and different writers may follow different conventions. It is common for the newer generation, however, to write the language based on the current orthographic rules of Filipino.

A noticeable feature of the Spanish-influenced orthography absent in those writing following Filipino's orthography is the use of "c" and "qu" in representing  (now replaced with "k" in all instances) and the absence of the letter "w" ("u" was formerly used in certain instances).

The core alphabet consists of 20 letters used for expressing consonants and vowels in Hiligaynon, each of which comes in an uppercase and lowercase variety.

Alphabet

Additional symbols
The apostrophe  and hyphen  also appear in Hiligaynon writing, and might be considered separate letters.

The hyphen, in particular, is used medially to indicate the glottal stop  'when'  'evening; night'. It is also used in reduplicated words:  'daily, every day', from  'day, sun'. This marking is not used in reduplicated words whose base is not also used independently, as in  'bird'.

In addition, some English letters may be used in borrowed words.

Grammar

Determiners
Hiligaynon has three types of case markers: absolutive, ergative, and oblique. These types in turn are divided into personal, that have to do with names of people, and impersonal, that deal with everything else, and further into singular and plural types, though the plural impersonal case markers are just the singular impersonal case markers +  (a contracted spelling for ), a particle used to denote plurality in Hiligaynon.

It appears in conservative translations of the Bible into Hiligaynon and in traditional or formal speech.
(**)The plural personal case markers are not used very often and not even by all speakers. Again, this is an example of a case marker that has fallen largely into disuse, but is still occasionally used when speaking a more traditional form of Hiligaynon, using fewer Spanish loan words.

The case markers do not determine which noun is the subject and which is the object; rather, the affix of the verb determines this, though the -marked noun is always the topic.

Personal pronouns

Demonstrative pronouns

Copula
Instead sentences in SV form are written without any marker or copula.

Examples: 
	
 (Tagalog)
	
 /  (Hiligaynon) = 'Saxa is beautiful.'
	
'Saxa is beautiful' (English)

There is no direct translation for the English copula to be in Hiligaynon. However, the prefixes  and  may be used to mean will be and became, respectively.

Example: 'It is nice to become rich.'

The Spanish copula  ('to be') has also become a part of the Hiligaynon lexicon. Its meaning and pronunciation have changed compared to its Spanish meaning, however.

Example: 'I live in tabuk suba'.  translates to 'other side of the river' and is also a barangay in Jaro, Iloilo.

Existential
To indicate the existence of an object, the word  is used.

Example:

Hiligaynon linkers

When an adjective modifies a noun, the linker  links the two.

Example:

'black dog'

Sometimes, if the linker is preceded by a word that ends in a vowel, glottal stop or the letter N, it becomes acceptable to contract it into -ng, as in Filipino. This is often used to make the words sound more poetic or to reduce the number of syllables.

The linker  is used if a number modifies a noun.

Example:

'six dogs'

Interrogative pronouns

 means 'where'.Example: 'Where are you now?'

 means 'when'Example: 'When is that?'

 means 'who'Example: 'Who is your friend?'

 means 'why'Example: 'Why won't you go?'

 means 'how', as in "How are you?"Example: 'How is the store?'

 means 'what'Example: 'What are you reading?'

 means 'how much/how many'Example: 'How many are with you?'

This word is notoriously difficult to translate into English, as English has no equivalent.Example: 'What place were you born into your family?'

Verbs

Focus

As it is essential for sentence structure and meaning, focus is a key concept in Hiligaynon and other Philippine languages. In English, in order to emphasize a part of a sentence, variation in intonation is usually employed – the voice is stronger or louder on the part emphasized. For example:

The man is stealing rice from the market for his sister.
The man is stealing rice from the market for his sister.
The man is stealing rice from the market for his sister.
The man is stealing rice from the market for his sister.

Furthermore, active and passive grammatical constructions can be used in English to place focus on the actor or object as the subject:

The man stole the rice. vs. The rice was stolen by the man.

In contrast, sentence focus in Philippine languages is built into the construction by grammatical elements. Focus is marked by verbal affixes and a special particle prior to the noun in focus. Consider the following Hiligaynon translations of the above sentences:

( 'man';  'to steal';  'rice';  'market';  'sibling';  'hand')

Summary table

Reduplication

Hiligaynon, like other Philippine languages, employs reduplication, the repetition of a root or stem of a word or part of a word for grammatical or semantic purposes. Reduplication in Hiligaynon tends to be limited to roots instead of affixes, as the only inflectional or derivational morpheme that seems to reduplicate is -pa-. Root reduplication suggests 'non-perfectiveness' or 'non-telicity'. Used with nouns, reduplication of roots indicate particulars which are not fully actualized members of their class. Note the following examples.

Reduplication of verbal roots suggests a process lacking a focus or decisive goal. The following examples describe events which have no apparent end, in the sense of lacking purpose or completion. A lack of seriousness may also be implied. Similarly, reduplication can suggest a background process in the midst of a foreground activity, as shown in (5).

When used with adjectival roots, non-telicity may suggest a gradualness of the quality, such as the comparison in (6). In comparative constructions the final syllables of each occurrence of the reduplicated root are accented. If the stress of the second occurrence is shifted to the first syllable, then the reduplicated root suggests a superlative degree, as in (7). While non-telicity can suggest augmentation, as shown in (7), it can also indicate diminishment as in shown in (9), in contrast with (8) (note the stress contrast). In (8b), accented in the superlative pattern, suggests a trajectory of improvement that has not been fully achieved. In (9b),  suggests a trajectory of decline when accented in the comparative pattern. The reduplicated  implies sub-optimal situations in both cases; full goodness/wellness is not achieved.

Vocabulary

Derived from Spanish

The same holds true for other languages such as Cebuano.

Examples

Numbers

Days of the week

The names of the days of the week are derived from their Spanish equivalents.

Months of the year

Quick phrases

Greetings

This/that/what

Space and time

Ancient times of the day

When buying

The Lord's Prayer

The Ten Commandments

Literal translation as per photo:
 Believe in God and worship only him
 Do not use the name of God without purpose
 Honor the day of the Lord
 Honor your father and mother
 Do not kill
 Do not pretend to be married against virginity (don't commit adultery)
 Do not steal
 Do not lie
 Do not have desire for the wife of your fellow man
 Do not covet the riches of your fellow man

Universal Declaration of Human Rights
Article 1 of the Universal Declaration of Human Rights

Notable Hiligaynon writers

Peter Solis Nery (born 1969) – prolific writer, poet, playwright, novelist, editor, "Hari sang Binalaybay", and champion of the Hiligaynon language. Born in Dumangas.
Antonio Ledesma Jayme (1854–1937) – lawyer, revolutionary, provincial governor and assemblyman. Born in Jaro, lived in Bacolod.
Graciano López Jaena (1856–1896) – journalist, orator, and revolutionary from Iloilo, well known for his written works, La Solidaridad and Fray Botod. Born in Jaro. 
Flavio Zaragoza y Cano (1892–1994) – lawyer, journalist and the "Prince of Visayan poets". Born in Janipaan, Cabatuan.
Conrado Saquian Norada (born 1921) – lawyer, intelligence officer and governor of Iloilo from 1969 to 1986. Co-founder and editor of Yuhum magazine. Born in Miag-ao.
Ramon Muzones (1913–1992) – prolific writer and lawyer, recipient of the National Artist of the Philippines for Literature award. Born in Miag-ao.
Magdalena Jalandoni (1891–1978) – prolific writer, novelist and feminist. Born in Jaro.
Angel Magahum Sr. (1876–1931) – writer, editor and composer. Composed the classic Iloilo ang Banwa Ko, the unofficial song of Iloilo. Born in Molo.
Valente Cristobal (1875–1945) – noted Hiligaynon playwright. Born in Polo (now Valenzuela City), Bulacan.
Elizabeth Batiduan Navarro – Hiligaynon drama writer for radio programs of Bombo Radyo Philippines.
Genevieve L. Asenjo – Filipino poet, novelist, translator and literary scholar in Kinaray-a, Hiligaynon and Filipino. Her first novel, (C&E/DLSU, 2010) received a citation for the Juan C. Laya Prize for Excellence in Fiction in a Philippine Language in the National Book Award.

See also

Cebuano language
Hiligaynon people
Languages of the Philippines
Kinaray-a language
Capiznon language

References

Further reading

 
  – published version of Wolfenden's 1972 dissertation

External links

 Omniglot on Hiligaynon writing
 Ilonggo Community & Discussion Board

Dictionaries
 Hiligaynon Dictionary
 Hiligaynon to English Dictionary
 English to Hiligaynon Dictionary
 Bansa.org Hiligaynon Dictionary
 Kaufmann's 1934 Hiligaynon dictionary on-line
Diccionario de la lengua Bisaya Hiligueina y Haraya de la Isla de Panay (by Alonso de Méntrida, published in 1841)

Learning resources
 Some information about learning Ilonggo
Hiligaynon Lessons (by Cecile L. Motus. 1971)
Hiligaynon Reference Grammar (by Elmer Wolfenden 1971)

Writing system (Baybayin)
Baybayin – The Ancient Script of the Philippines
The evolution of the native Hiligaynon alphabet
The evolution of the native Hiligaynon alphabet: Genocide
The importance of the Hiligaynon 32-letter alphabet

Primary texts
 Online E-book of Ang panilit sa pagcasal ñga si D.ª Angela Dionicia: sa mercader ñga contragusto in Hiligaynon, published in Mandurriao, Iloilo (perhaps in the early 20th century)

Secondary Llterature
Language and Desire in Hiligaynon (by Corazón D. Villareal. 2006)
Missionary Linguistics: selected papers from the First International Conference on Missionary Linguistics, Oslo, March 13–16th, 2003 (ed. by Otto Zwartjes and Even Hovdhaugen)

 
Verb–subject–object languages